Aldama is a surname. Notable people with the surname include:

Andrés Aldama (born 1956), Cuban boxer
Ángel Aldama (born 1936), Guatemalan sport wrestler
Frederick Luis Aldama, American academic
Juan Aldama (1774–1811), insurgent leader in the Mexican War of Independence
Monica Aldama, American cheerleading coach
Santiago Aldama, Spanish basketball player
Santi Aldama, Spanish basketball player and son of Santiago
Yamilé Aldama (born 1972), triple-jumper from Cuba who has represented both Sudan and Great Britain